Neoterebra sterigma is a species of sea snail, a marine gastropod mollusk in the family Terebridae, the auger snails.

Description
The length of the shell attains 11.9 mm.

Distribution
This species occurs in the Atlantic Ocean off Southeast Brazil.

References

External links
 Fedosov, A. E.; Malcolm, G.; Terryn, Y.; Gorson, J.; Modica, M. V.; Holford, M.; Puillandre, N. (2020). Phylogenetic classification of the family Terebridae (Neogastropoda: Conoidea). Journal of Molluscan Studies

Terebridae
Gastropods described in 1999